Carol Teichrob (née Sproxton; August 27, 1939 – December 18, 2022) was a Saskatchewan politician, member of the legislative assembly (MLA) for eight years. She was an agricultural producer for 35 years, and also served as councillor and reeve of the Rural Municipality (RM) of Corman Park ten years.

Biography

Marriage and children
Teichrob and her husband Donald have three children, as well as seven grandchildren and two great grandchildren.

Teichrob died in Prince George, British Columbia on December 18, 2022.

Political career

Teichrob became a member of the legislative assembly (MLA) first representing the former electoral districts of River Heights, Saskatoon 1991–1995.  Teichrob (New Democrat party) represented Saskatoon Meewasin  in the 1995 Saskatchewan general election held June 21, 1995.  Teichrob was the incumbent for Saskatoon Meewasin in the 1999 Saskatchewan general election held September 16, 1999.  Teichrob retired and Carolyn Jones became the new MLA.  Carol Teichrob was a former Saskatchewan NDP MLA and Cabinet Minister, who switched parties to become a Conservative Party supporter.

Premier Roy Romanow thanked Teichrob on March 31, 1999 for her contributions to
the province of Saskatchewan.  As Education minister (1991) she energised Saskatchewan Communications Network (SCN), and was instrumental in the formation of Saskatchewan's Francophone school system.  In 1995 as Minister of Municipal Government, she helped implement the Northern Roundtable dialog and brought the local assessments up to date across Saskatchewan.  She assisted the provincial Arts Board to come to fruition.  Teichrob increased revenue and decreased administrative costs by contracting the Western Canada Lottery Corporation (WCLC) under the Ontario
Lottery Corporation (OLC).

Party switch
Teichrob joined the Co-operative Commonwealth Federation (CCF) youth party at a young age of 13.  During the fall of 2007, she was the co-chair for the NDP's provincial campaign.  In the spring of 2008, she supported a SHRA colleague, Kelly Block, Conservative candidate running in the federal riding of Saskatoon-Rosetown-Biggar.

Community work
Teichrob has been active as a director for a number of organisations including the Farm Credit Corporation, the Canadian Federation of Agriculture and the Saskatchewan Research Council.  She belonged to the University of Saskatchewan Senate and the Saskatoon Chamber of Commerce.

Awards
Teichrob was the recipient of the YWCA Woman of the Year award in the Business category.  She also received the Golden Wheel award for Industry and Commerce from the Rotary Club in 1990.

References

1939 births
2022 deaths
Saskatchewan New Democratic Party MLAs
Farmers from Saskatchewan
Women MLAs in Saskatchewan
Women government ministers of Canada
Members of the Executive Council of Saskatchewan
20th-century Canadian politicians
20th-century Canadian women politicians
21st-century Canadian politicians
21st-century Canadian women politicians